Dark Journey may refer to:

 Dark Journey (film), a 1937 British spy film
 Dark Journey (novel), a Star Wars novel by Elaine Cunningham
 "Dark Journey" (comics), a story in Star Wars Tales 17
 Dark Journey (wrestling), Linda Newton,  professional wrestling valet
 A Dark Journey, a novel in the Tenabran Trilogy by Dave Luckett